is a 1958 Japanese black and white film directed by Kimiyoshi Yasuda.

Cast 
 Raizo Ichikawa
 Narutoshi Hayashi
 Mieko Kondo
 Yōko Uraji

References

External links 
  http://www.raizofan.net/link4/movie3/jumon.htm

Japanese black-and-white films
1958 films
Films directed by Kimiyoshi Yasuda
Daiei Film films
1950s Japanese films